Noraladin Pirmoazzen (born 1959) is an Iranian politician, lung and breast surgeon. He was professor the university of medical sciences in Iran that since 2008 lives in The United States. His younger brother, Kamaladin was also a member of parliament.

Pirmoazzen was born in Ardabil. He was a member of the 6th and 7th Islamic Consultative Assembly from the electorate of Ardabil, Nir, Namin and Sareyn.

References

People from Ardabil
Deputies of Ardabil, Nir, Namin and Sareyn
1958 births
Members of the 6th Islamic Consultative Assembly
Members of the 7th Islamic Consultative Assembly
American people of Iranian-Azerbaijani descent
Iranian surgeons
Living people
Iranian reformists
Islamic Iran Participation Front politicians